Kristjan T. Ragnarsson, M.D., is an American physiatrist with an international reputation in the rehabilitation of individuals with disorders of the central nervous system. He is currently the Dr. Lucy G. Moses Professor and Chair of Rehabilitation Medicine at The Mount Sinai Medical Center in New York City.

Ragnarsson is the author of multiple book chapters and more than 100 articles. He is listed among New York Magazine’s Best Doctors of 2009 and among Castle Connolly's "Top Doctors in America" every year since 2002.

Biography
Ragnarsson was born in 1943 in Reykjavík, Iceland. He graduated from the University of Iceland School of Medicine in 1969 and completed a residency in physical medicine and rehabilitation and a clinical research fellowship in spinal cord injury (SCI) medicine at the Rusk Institute of Rehabilitation Medicine at NYU. He was appointed to the faculty of the Department of Rehabilitation Medicine of the NYU School of Medicine in 1976 and served as director of the New York SCI Model System of Care from 1981 to 1986. In 1986, he was appointed Professor and Chair of the Department of Rehabilitation Medicine at The Mount Sinai Medical Center.

Ragnarsson served as president of the American Spinal Injury Association from 1993 to 1995. From 1995 to 1997 he served as president of The Mount Sinai Hospital Medical Board, and from 1997 until 2003 he chaired the Board of Governors of The Mount Sinai Faculty Practice Associates. He was a member of the board of the American Paraplegia Society from 1997 to 1999 and a member of the United States Department of Veterans' Affairs Scientific Merit Review Board from 1984 until 2000. In 1998, he chaired the National Institutes of Health consensus conference on "Rehabilitation of Persons with Traumatic Brain Injury." He has been a member of the American Medical Association since 1976. Currently he serves as President of the Association of Academic Psysiatrists and Vice President of the Foundation for Physical Medicine and Rehabilitation.

Honors and awards
Partial list (since 2002):

American Spinal Injury Association (ASIA) Lifetime Achievement Award. Presented at joint meeting of ASIA and the International Spinal Cord Society. Vancouver, Canada, May 4, 2002.
Ellis Island Medal of Honor, May 15, 2004
Distinguished Member Award – American Academy of Physical Medicine and Rehabilitation, October 8, 2004
Distinguished Public Service Award, American Academy of Physical Medicine and Rehabilitation. November 10, 2006.
New York Super Doctors. Key Professional Media. Election by other physicians: Listed in The New York Times Magazine. 2008, 2009.

Publications
Partial list:
Functional electrical stimulation after spinal cord injury: current use, therapeutic effects and future directions. Ragnarsson KT. Spinal Cord. 2008 Apr;46(4):255-74. Epub 11 September 2007. Review. 
Traumatic brain injury research since the 1998 NIH Consensus Conference: accomplishments and unmet goals. Ragnarsson KT. J Head Trauma Rehabil. 2006 Sep-Oct;21(5):379-87. 
Reliability of the Bryce/Ragnarsson spinal cord injury pain taxonomy. Bryce TN, Dijkers MP, Ragnarsson KT, Stein AB, Chen B. J Spinal Cord Med. 2006;29(2):118-32. 
Spinal cord injury clinical trials for neurologic restoration: improving care through clinical research. Ragnarsson KT, Wuermser LA, Cardenas DD, Marino RJ. Am J Phys Med Rehabil. 2005 Nov;84 (11 Suppl):S77-97; quiz S98-100. 
The effect of electrically induced lower extremity ergometry on an ischial pressure ulcer: a case study. Pollack SF, Ragnarsson KT, Dijkers M. J Spinal Cord Med. 2004;27(2):143-7. Erratum in: J Spinal Cord Med. 2005;28(1):19. Djikers, Marcel. 
Quality of life in patients with spinal cord injury—basic issues, assessment, and recommendations. Wood-Dauphinée S, Exner G, Bostanci B, Exner G, Glass C, Jochheim KA, Kluger P, Koller M, Krishnan KR, Post MW, Ragnarsson KT, Rommel T, Zitnay G; SCI Consensus Group. Restor Neurol Neurosci. 2002;20(3-4):135-49. Review. 
Results of the NIH consensus conference on "rehabilitation of persons with traumatic brain injury". Ragnarsson KT. Restor Neurol Neurosci. 2002;20(3-4):103-8. Review. 
Rehabilitation of the patient with chronic critical illness. Thomas DC, Kreizman IJ, Melchiorre P, Ragnarsson KT. Crit Care Clin. 2002 Jul;18(3):695-715. Review. 
Diagnosis and Treatment of Traumatic Brain Injury. Ragnarsson KT. JAMA. 10 May 2000;283(18):2392. 
Pain after spinal cord injury. Bryce TN, Ragnarsson KT. Phys Med Rehabil Clin N Am. 2000 Feb;11(1):157-68. Review. 
Medical rehabilitation length of stay and outcomes for persons with traumatic spinal cord injury—1990-1997. Eastwood EA, Hagglund KJ, Ragnarsson KT, Gordon WA, Marino RJ. Arch Phys Med Rehabil. 1999 Nov;80(11):1457-63. 
Physical medicine and rehabilitation at the Mount Sinai medical center during the 20th century. Ragnarsson KT. Mt Sinai J Med. 1999 May;66(3):139-44. 
Restorative treatment of persons with spinal cord injury: current trends. Ragnarsson KT. J Rehabil Res Dev. 1998 Oct;35(4):xi-xiv. Review. 
Three women with lupus transverse myelitis: case reports and differential diagnosis. Inslicht DV, Stein AB, Pomerantz F, Ragnarsson KT. Arch Phys Med Rehabil. 1998 Apr;79(4):456-9.

References

External links
"Health Maintenance And Reduction Of Disability Through Physical Exercise" by Dr. Kristjan T. Ragnarsson. ScienceNiche.com, August 15, 2009
 

1943 births
Living people
Icahn School of Medicine at Mount Sinai faculty
Kristjan T. Ragnarsson
Kristjan T. Ragnarsson